Andrew Conway Ivy (February 25, 1893 – February 7, 1978) was an American physician. He was appointed by the American Medical Association as its representative at the 1946 Nuremberg Medical Trial for Nazi doctors, but later fell into disrepute for advocating the fraudulent drug Krebiozen.

Personal life
Born in Farmington, Missouri, Ivy grew up in Cape Girardeau, Missouri. His father was a science professor and his mother was a teacher.  Ivy trained in medicine and physiology in Chicago and taught at Northwestern University before becoming vice president of the University of Illinois, being responsible for the medicine, dentistry and pharmacy schools. From 1939 to 1941 he was president of the American Physiological Society. According to author Jonathan Moreno, by the end of the war he was probably the most famous doctor in the country. He was author of the Green report.

In 1919, he was married to Emma Anna Kohman, who had her PhD in physiology from the University of Chicago. The couple raised five sons, four of whom became doctors and one whom started a pharmaceutical company.

Educational career 
Ivy was considered "one of the nation’s top physiologists" and "the conscience of U.S. Science" at the time of the Nuremberg trials in 1946, according to an article in Time magazine. At the Nuremberg trials, the German physician, Dr. Werner Leibbrant was interrogated on the stand and it became evident that the Germans questioning him were attempting to identify parallels between the medical research they did during the war and the human subjects research taking place in the states especially at Stateville, Illinois. This was unexpected by the United States, and the biggest challenge for disputing these attempts was that there were no concrete guidelines or written documentation for the ethics of human medical experimentation. After Ivy initially appeared at the Nuremberg courtroom in January 1947 and heard these proceedings, he went back to Illinois and asked the state Governor, Dwight H. Green, to set up a committee with him as the lead to assess the ethicality of the prisoner experiments that took place at Stateville. The governor agreed and sent out letters to potential candidates to join him on the committee. The committee search resulted in six members, and it was collectively called the "Green committee". During the questioning of Ivy at the stand in June 1947 at the trials, the same attorney who had questioned Leibbrant to get his point across regarding the equivalence of the U.S. human experimentation at Stateville, also probed Ivy, but with more focus on the Green committee. After the trials, Ivy had returned to Illinois and wrote a letter to his fellow Green committee members to tell them the details of the testimony. For the next few months, the Green committee met and worked on a final report to submit to the governor regarding their determination of ethics at Statesville. Their major conclusions were that the "all subjects [prisoners at Stateville] have been volunteers in the absence of coercion in any form." The report was submitted to The Journal of the American Medical Association (JAMA). The report was published in February 1948 and it represented an important support for future prisoner experimentation in the United States. The conclusions drawn in the report, which praised the practices taking place in the research at Stateville, denounced all criticism of the work and would encourage it more. Additionally, Ivy would generate new ethical guidelines for human research including the embryonic code of August 1946 which supported the use of animal experiments for protecting human life and the November 1947 statement which pleaded for physiologists and doctors to be against antivivisectionists in order to promote medical progress and human welfare. Altogether, the important points of his principles for human experimentation included 1) a need for consent, 2) carefully designing and planning experiments based on the results of animal experimentation in order to benefit society, and 3) performing these experiments by trained personnel to avoid mishaps and injuries that may result in a disability for the subject.

When Ivy testified at the 1946 Nuremberg Medical Trial for Nazi war criminals, he misled the trial about the Green report, in order to strengthen the prosecution case: Ivy stated that the committee had debated and issued the report, when the committee had not met at that time.

Professional focus 
As a physician, Ivy did extensive research on cancer physiology and gastroenterology. He hypothesized that larger, multicellular organisms have an “anticancer substance” that helped to suppress the cancer which should have been more likely with more cells present. This substance he called "carcalon." His work on the gastrointestinal system led to an important publication of his entitled “Peptic Ulcer.” This was co-authored with Drs. Morton Grossman and Bachrach. Ivy and his colleagues were able to publish more than 1500 papers. His work was so interesting that he was cited more than any other researcher between the years of 1964 to 1971. He is most known for this interest in gastroenterology in which he made breakthroughs in understanding pancreatic and gastric secretions, and the discovery of a hormone named cholecystokinin and urogastrone. In addition, his work resulted in new types of procedures including the "Ivy bleeding time" for diagnosing clotting abnormalities.

Enterogastrone 
One breakthrough in gastroenterology made by Ivy was the observance of hunger inhibition with fat. Ivy et al., was able to show that in their research presented at the Cold Spring Harbor Symposia on Quantitative Biology that neutral fat working in the upper intestine is able to exhibit inhibition of gastric secretion. This was evidence of a possible humoral mechanism, acting in the blood, which is causing the inhibition of hunger. The researchers were able to extract an inhibitory agent from the upper intestinal mucosa which was able to inhibit gastric secretions.

Corruption with Krebiozen 
Ivy's reputation collapsed after 1949 when he steadfastly supported Krebiozen, an alleged cancer drug with no known beneficial effects.

While considered the foremost medical professional during the time of the Nuremberg trials, later on his life, he would come to be shamed for his support of a drug called Krebiozen. Originally created by a Yugoslavian refugee doctor named Stevan Durovic, the drug was derived from the blood of horses that had been given growth factors and was meant to treat cancer. In fact, Durovic told Ivy that his drug had cleared 7 of 12 dogs of cancer within 6 months and the remaining 5 showed great improvement. Ivy accepted the drug at Durovic’s word and began testing on humans within the next month. Within a year and a half, Ivy characterized the results from his experiment as a "dramatic clinical improvement. At a press conference, Ivy reported that no patients given the drug had died of cancer.  However, 10 of the 22 patients in the trial had actually died of cancer. Instead, he posted that they had different causes of death. The medical community immediately began trying to recreate these results of his experiments with no success. Yet, instead of rescinding his results, Ivy claimed that the AMA and the American Cancer Society were trying to prevent the distribution of their drug to the market. As a result, Kreboizen continued to be given to patients, particularly those grasping at the last straws of life. In fact, in 1962, the foundation founded by Ivy published results stating that 3,300 physicians used Kreboizen to treat 4,227 patients. Ivy could not carry the lie of the efficacy of his drug forever though. In February 1959, Dr. Ivy began a research record of a patient named Mr. Taietti who had bladder cancer. Dr. Ivy reported that the patient had been showing improvement and that the bladder tumor had decreased in size. However, upon investigation by the FDA, it was found that the patient had died of bladder cancer in 1955. This falsification of information and intentional deception resulted in Ivy being charged with fraud. However, in 1965, Ivy was found not guilty and he then severed his ties with Mr. Stevan Durovic.

Notes

1893 births
1978 deaths
Alternative cancer treatment advocates
American physiologists
Nuremberg trials
People from Farmington, Missouri

External links 
LIFE Magazine article (Oct. 9, 1964)